Kristina Krawiec  is a geoarchaeologist and Head of Geoarchaeology at York Archaeological Trust. She was elected as a fellow of the Society of Antiquaries of London on 17 November 2022.

Select publications
Lobb, M., Krawiec, K., Howard, A.J, Geary, B.R., and Chapman, H.P. 2010. "A new approach to recording and monitoring wet-preserved archaeological wood using three-dimensional laser scanning", Journal of Archaeological Science37, 2295-2999. 
Krawiec, K., Gearey, B.R., Chapman, H.P., Hopla, E-J., Bamforth, M., Griffiths, C., Hill, T.C.B., and Tyers, I. 2011. "A Late Prehistoric Timber Alignment in the Waveney Valley, Suffolk: Excavations at Barsham Marshes", Journal of Wetland Archaeology, 10, 46-70. 
Cuttler, R., Hepburn, S., Hewitson, C., and Krawiec, K> 2012. Gorse Stacks - 2000 Years of Quarrying and Waste Disposal in Chester (BAR British Series 563).

References

Fellows of the Society of Antiquaries of London
Women archaeologists
Date of birth missing (living people)
Geoarchaeologists
People from York
Year of birth missing (living people)
Living people